Mohammed Usman may refer to:

 Mohammed Usman (footballer, born 1980), Nigerian footballer for Kwara United F.C.
 Mohammed Usman (footballer, born 1994), Nigerian footballer for Sarpsborg 08

See also
 Mohammad Usman (disambiguation)